Ondřej Knotek (born 31 August 1984 in Sušice) is a Czech politician who was elected as a Member of the European Parliament in 2019. 

In parliament, Knotek has since been serving on the Committee on Regional Development. In 2020, he also joined the Special Committee on Beating Cancer.

In addition to his committee assignments, Knotek is part of the Parliament's delegation to the EU-Montenegro Stabilisation and Association Parliamentary Committee.

References

1984 births
Living people
People from Sušice
MEPs for the Czech Republic 2019–2024
ANO 2011 MEPs
ANO 2011 politicians
University of Chemistry and Technology, Prague alumni